Gustaf Sobin (November 15, 1935 – July 7, 2005) was a U.S.-born poet and author who spent most of his adult life in France. Originally from Boston, Sobin attended the Choate School, Brown University, and moved to Paris in 1962. Eventually he settled in the village of Goult, Provence, where he remained for over forty years, publishing more than a dozen books of poetry, four novels, a children's story, and two compilations of essays.

Sobin maintained his expatriate status until his death in July, 2005 of pancreatic cancer at the age of 69.

Life and work
After studies with René Char, Gustaf Sobin developed a poetic style that relies heavily on assonance and consonance, as well as other methods of the sonic organization of speech. He published many books across different genres: fiction, essays, and translations (including a translation of Henri Michaux's Ideograms in China, a prose poem about Chinese orthography). More recent translations include The Brittle Age and Returning Upland, two volumes from Char's work of the mid to late 1960s that Sobin chose to translate in full, published posthumously in 2009, side by side with Char's French text.

Among his many books are Breath's Burials (poetry, New Directions, 1995), Luminous Debris (1999) and Ladder of Shadows (2008) (essays, University of California Press), and Collected Poetry (2010). Among his works of fiction are the novels The Fly Truffler (about the art of truffle-hunting in Southern France), and In Pursuit of a Vanishing Star, which is a chronicle of a brief period of Greta Garbo's early acting career.

Gustaf Sobin was survived by his wife, Susannah Bott, his daughter Esther, his son Gabriel, an older brother Harris (now deceased), of Phoenix, Arizona, and his devoted cousin, Mikki Ansin of Cambridge, Massachusetts. Sobin's brother Harris, an architect and architectural historian, designed the rehabilitation of Gustaf Sobin's residence and two additions for a historic stone cocoonery in Provence, France.

Before his death, Sobin named U.S. poets Andrew Joron and Andrew Zawacki as the co-executors of his literary estate.

Select bibliography
The Tale of the Yellow Triangle. With illustrations by Jolaine Meyer and text by Gustaf Sobin. G. Braziller (1973).
Gustaf Sobin. A reading, February 7, 1996 in the Modern Languages Auditorium, sponsored by The University of Arizona Poetry Center.
Ideograms in China. Henri Michaux, translated from the French by Gustaf Sobin. New Directions (2002).
The Brittle Age and Returning Upland. Rene Char. Translated by Gustaf Sobin. Counterpath (2009).

Poetry
 Wind Chrysalid's Rattle. Montemora Supplement NY, 1980.
 Caesurae: Midsummer. Blue Guitar Books/Shearsman Supplement, Kuala Lumpur, Malaysia, 1981.
 Celebration of the Sound Through. Montemora Supplement, NY, 1982.
 Carnets 1979-1982. Shearsman Books, 1984.
 Nile. Oasis/Shearsman, London UK, 1984. 
 The Earth As Air. New Directions, NY, 1984. 
 Miniatures. (Cadmus Editions, San Francisco, 1986: 200 copies, privately distributed)
 Voyaging Portraits. New Directions, NY, 1988. 
 Blown Letters, Driven Alphabets. Shearsman Books, Plymouth, UK, 1994.
 Breath's Burials. New Directions, NY, 1995. 
 By the Bias of Sound: Selected Poems 1974-1994. Talisman House, Jersey City, NJ, 1995. 
 A World of Letters: Poems. Arcturus Editions (1998).
 Towards the Blanched Alphabets (Talisman House, 1998. 123pp, h/c & pb)
 Articles of Light & Elation (Cadmus, 1998. 50pp)
 In the Name of the Neither (Talisman House, 2002. 57pp, pb)
 The Places as Preludes (Talisman House, 2005, 76pp, pb)
 Collected Poems (Talisman House, 2010, 756pp, pb)

Prose, fiction & essays
Venus Blue (Bloomsbury, London, 1991, out of print) - novel
Dark Mirrors (Bloomsbury, 1992, out of print) - novel
The Fly-Truffler (Norton, New York, 1999) - novel
Luminous Debris: Reflecting on Vestige in Provence and Languedoc (University of California Press, 1999. 247pp, pb) - essays
In Pursuit of a Vanishing Star (Norton, NY, 2002) - novel
Ladder of Shadows: Reflecting on Medieval Vestige in Provence and Languedoc (University of California Press, 2009. 208pp. pb, hc) - essays- companion volume to Luminous Debris
Aura: Last Essays. Counterpath, 2009.

References

External links 
Obituary at Guardian Unlimited
SHEARSMAN BOOKS:– Recommendations features a comprehensive listing of books by Sobin
"Sparkling signatures" Edmund Hardy reviews The Places As Preludes on-line at "Jacket Magazine" (number 31 : October 2006)
I had an “aha moment” reading René Char’s "The Brittle Age and Returning Upland" Ron Silliman's essay on Sobin's translations of two books of poetry by Sobin's friend and mentor Rene Char
Gustaf Sobin Archive located at the Yale University's Beinecke Library
Gustaf Sobin Papers. Yale Collection of American Literature, Beinecke Rare Book and Manuscript Library.
Multimedia, audio & video files
Words Through: A Tribute to Gustaf Sobin video recordings from the panel celebrating the life and work of Gustaf Sobin on March 6, 2010 at the University of Arizona Poetry Center

1935 births
2005 deaths
20th-century American novelists
21st-century American novelists
American male novelists
Deaths from pancreatic cancer
20th-century American poets
21st-century American poets
American male poets
20th-century American biographers
21st-century American biographers
20th-century American male writers
21st-century American male writers
American male biographers